The New Caledonian barn owl (Tyto letocarti), also referred to as Letocart's barn owl, is an extinct species of owl in the barn owl family.  It was endemic to the island of New Caledonia in Melanesia in the southwestern Pacific region.  It was described from Holocene aged subfossil bones found at the Gilles Cave paleontological site on the west coast of Grande Terre.  The holotype is a complete adult left femur (NCG 1000), held by the Muséum national d'histoire naturelle in Paris.  The owl was described as Tyto? letocarti, indicating uncertainty as to generic placement at the time.  The specific epithet honours Yves Letocart of New Caledonia's Water and Forest Service, who was active in bird conservation and paleontological work on the island.

References

Tyto
Extinct birds of New Caledonia
Holocene extinctions
Birds described in 1989
Fossil taxa described in 1989
Taxa named by Jean-Christophe Balouet